Sinan Bytyqi (born 15 January 1995) is a Kosovan professional football manager and former player who is the manager of Unterliga Ost club Weiz II.

Club career

Admira
His first inclusion in Admira II's matchday squad was as an unused substitute against Wiener in week 16 of the 2011–12 season in the Austrian Regional League East on 2 March 2012. The following week he made his debut in the starting XI playing the first 55 minutes before being replaced by Daniel Maurer in a 1–0 home win against SV Schwechat. In the third consecutive game, Bytyqi played again and as a starter on  16 March 2012 against Neusiedl am See 1919, which finished in a 4–1 loss, where he was substituted off in the 75th minute for David Peham.

Manchester City
On 24 September 2014 Bytyqi was included in the teamsheet in a 2014–15 Football League Cup match against Sheffield Wednesday, which finished in a 7–0 victory. Bytyqi was an unused substitute and held the shirt number 75.

After fellow Kosovan player Bersant Celina was provided a professional contract with Manchester City, on 9 January 2015 Bytyqi also signed a professional contract and was subsequently loaned to Dutch side Cambuur, whom finished the 2014–15 Eredivisie in seventh place, which ensured participation in the UEFA Europa League. Unfortunately, Sinan's time in the Eredivisie was cut short when he sustained an injury in a game against Heracles Almelo in the spring. He made his long-awaited comeback for the EDS against Southampton F.C. in December 2015, helping the team finish out a strong season.

Loan at Cambuur
On 17 January 2015. Bytyqi made it his debut in professional level with Cambuur in a 2–2 away draw against ADO Den Haag, coming on as a substitute for Daniël de Ridder in the 64th minute.
On 28 February 2015, he suffered a season ending knee injury in a match against Heracles Almelo which sidelined him for approximately six months.

Loan at Go Ahead Eagles
He was again loaned to a Dutch club in summer 2016, joining Go Ahead Eagles. He injured his ankle after only a few games and did not return after he was diagnosed with heart problems in December 2016.

Retirement
Following a diagnosis of hypertrophic cardiomyopathy, Bytyqi made the decision to retire from professional football, and took up a position as a loan scout for Manchester City.

International career
From 2011, until 2016, Bytyqi has been part of Austria at youth international level, respectively has been part of the U17, U18, U19 and U21 teams and he with these teams played nineteen matches and scored ten goals. On 2 October 2016, he received a call-up from Kosovo for a 2018 FIFA World Cup qualification matches against Croatia and Ukraine. Bytyqi was an unused substitute in both matches.

References

External links

Sinan Bytyqi at Manchester City F.C.

1995 births
Living people
Sportspeople from Prizren
Kosovo Albanians
Austrian people of Albanian descent
Austrian people of Kosovan descent
Association football midfielders
Association football forwards
Kosovan footballers
Kosovo youth international footballers
Austrian footballers
Austria youth international footballers
Austria under-21 international footballers
Manchester City F.C. players
SC Cambuur players
Go Ahead Eagles players
Eredivisie players
Austrian expatriate footballers
Kosovan expatriate footballers
Kosovan expatriate sportspeople in Austria
Expatriate footballers in England
Kosovan expatriate sportspeople in England
Expatriate footballers in the Netherlands
Kosovan expatriate sportspeople in the Netherlands
Manchester City F.C. non-playing staff